Kanagawa 2nd district (神奈川県第2区, Kanagawa-ken dai-niku or 神奈川2区, Kanagawa niku) is a single-member constituency of the House of Representatives, the lower house of the national Diet of Japan. It is located in eastern Kanagawa Prefecture and consists of Yokohama city's Nishi (West), Minami (South) and Kōnan wards. As of December 1, 2020, 435,659 eligible voters were registered in the district.

Before the electoral reform of the 1990s, the area had been split between the former four-member 1st district and the former five-member 4th district.

The 2nd district's only representative since the electoral reform has been Liberal Democrat Yoshihide Suga (without factional affiliation), the former Prime Minister of Japan, and a former member of the Yokohama city council who entered the Diet as a newcomer in 1996. He was able to beat Akihiro Ueda (New Frontier Party, ex-Kōmeitō), one of the incumbents for the pre-reform 4th district. In subsequent elections he defended the seat against Democrats Akira Ōide and Kazuya Miura. Suga was Internal Affairs Minister in the First Abe cabinet and Chief Cabinet Secretary in the Second Abe Cabinet.

List of the member representing the district

Election results

2021

2017

2014

2012

2009

2005

2003

2000

1996

 
 
 }

 }
 }

References 

Kanagawa Prefecture
Districts of the House of Representatives (Japan)
Yokohama